This is an incomplete list of Acts of the Parliament of the United Kingdom for the years 1880–1899.  Note that the first parliament of the United Kingdom was held in 1801; parliaments between 1707 and 1800 were either parliaments of Great Britain or of Ireland).  For Acts passed up until 1707 see List of Acts of the Parliament of England and List of Acts of the Parliament of Scotland.  For Acts passed from 1707 to 1800 see List of Acts of the Parliament of Great Britain.  See also the List of Acts of the Parliament of Ireland.

For Acts of the devolved parliaments and assemblies in the United Kingdom, see the List of Acts of the Scottish Parliament, the List of Acts of the Northern Ireland Assembly, and the List of Acts and Measures of the National Assembly for Wales; see also the List of Acts of the Parliament of Northern Ireland.

The number shown after each Act's title is its chapter number. Acts passed before 1963 are cited using this number, preceded by the year(s) of the reign during which the relevant parliamentary session was held; thus the Union with Ireland Act 1800 is cited as "39 & 40 Geo. 3 c. 67", meaning the 67th Act passed during the session that started in the 39th year of the reign of George III and which finished in the 40th year of that reign.  Note that the modern convention is to use Arabic numerals in citations (thus "41 Geo. 3" rather than "41 Geo. III"). Acts of the last session of the Parliament of Great Britain and the first session of the Parliament of the United Kingdom are both cited as "41 Geo. 3".  Acts passed from 1963 onwards are simply cited by calendar year and chapter number.

All modern Acts have a short title, e.g. the Local Government Act 2003.  Some earlier Acts also have a short title given to them by later Acts, such as by the Short Titles Act 1896.

1880–1889

1880

43 Vict.

 Appropriation Act 1880 c. 13
 Army Discipline and Regulation (Annual) Act 1880 c. 9
 Artizans and Labourers Dwellings Improvement (Scotland) Act 1880 c. 2
 Artizans' Dwellings Act (1868) Amendment Act (1879) Amendment Act 1880 c. 8
 Beer Dealers Retail Licences Act 1880 c. 6
 Companies Act 1880 c. 19
 Consolidated Fund (No. 1) Act 1880 c. 5
 Customs and Inland Revenue Act 1880 c. 14
 East India Loan (East Indian Railway Debentures) Act 1880 c. 10
 Exchequer Bills and Bonds Act 1880 c. 16
 Hypothec Abolition (Scotland) Act 1880 c. 12
 India Stock (Powers of Attorney) Act 1880 c. 11
 Indian Salaries and Allowances Act 1880 c. 3
 National Debt Act 1880 c. 15
 Parliamentary Elections and Corrupt Practices Act 1880 c. 18
 Relief of Distress (Ireland) Act 1880 c. 4
 Roads Amendment Act 1880 c. 7
 Seed Supply (Ireland) Act 1880 c. 1
 Town Councils and Local Boards Act 1880 c. 17

43 & 44 Vict.

 Annual Turnpike Acts Continuance Act 1880 c. 12
 Appropriation Act 1880 (Session 2) c. 40
 Bastardy Orders Act 1880 c. 32
 Births and Deaths Registration Act (Ireland), 1880 c. 13
 Burial Laws Amendment Act 1880 c. 41
 Census (Ireland) Act 1880 c. 28
 Census (Scotland) Act 1880 c. 38
 Census Act 1880 c. 37
 Consolidated Fund (No. 1) Act 1880 (Session 2) c. 3
 Consolidated Fund (No. 2) Act 1880 (Session 2) c. 30
 County Bridges Loans Extension Act 1880 c. 5
 County Court Jurisdiction in Lunacy (Ireland) Act 1880 c. 39
 Courts of Justice Building Amendment Act 1880 c. 29
 Criminal Law Amendment Act 1880 c. 45
 Debtors (Scotland) Act 1880 c. 34
 Drainage and Improvement of Lands (Ireland) Act 1880 c. 27
 Elementary Education Act 1880 c. 23
 Employers' Liability Act 1880 c. 42
 Exchequer Bills and Bonds Act 1880 (Session 2) c. 21
 Expiring Laws Continuance Act 1880 c. 48
 Glebe Loan (Ireland) Acts Amendment Act 1880 c. 2
 Great Seal Act 1880 c. 10
 Ground Game Act 1880 c. 47
 House Occupiers in Counties Disqualification Removal (Scotland) Act 1880 c. 6
 Industrial Schools Act Amendment Act 1880 c. 15
 Inland Revenue Act 1880 c. 20
 Irish Loans Act 1880 c. 44
 Isle of Man Loans Act 1880 c. 8
 Judicial Factors (Scotland) Act 1880 c. 4
 Married Women's Policies of Assurance (Scotland) Act 1880 c. 26
 Merchant Seamen (Payment of Wages and Rating) Act 1880 c. 16
 Merchant Shipping (Carriage of Grain) Act 1880 c. 43
 Merchant Shipping (Fees and Expenses) Act 1880 c. 22
 Merchant Shipping Act (1854) Amendment Act 1880 c. 18
 Metropolitan Board of Works (Money) Act 1880 c. 25
 Metropolitan Railway Act 1880 c. 166
 Post Office (Money Orders) Act 1880 c. 33
 Public Works Loans Act 1880 c 1
 Railways Construction Amendment (Ireland) Act 1880 c. 31
 Relief of Distress (Ireland) Amendment Act 1880 c. 14
 Revenue Offices (Scotland) Holidays Act 1880 c. 17
 Rickmansworth Extension Railway Act 1880 c. 134
 Savings Banks Act 1880 c. 36
 Spirits Act 1880 c. 24
 Statutes (Definition of Time) Act 1880 c. 9
 Taxes Management Act 1880 c. 19
 Union Assessment Act 1880 c. 7
 Universities and College Estates Amendment Act 1880 c. 46
 Universities of Oxford and Cambridge (Limited Tenures) Act 1880 c. 11
 Wild Birds Protection Act 1880 c. 35

1881 (44 & 45 Vict.)

 Alkali, &c. Works Regulation Act 1881 c. 37
 Annual Turnpike Acts Continuance Act 1881 c. 31
 Appropriation Act 1881 c. 56
 Army Act 1881 c. 58
 Army Discipline and Regulation (Annual) Act 1881 c. 9
 Bankruptcy and Cessio (Scotland) Act 1881 c. 22
 British Honduras (Court of Appeal) Act 1881 c. 36
 Burial Grounds (Scotland) Act 1855, Amendment Act 1881 c. 27
 Burial and Registration Acts (Doubts Removal) Act 1881 c. 2
 Central Criminal Court (Prisons) Act 1881 c. 64
 Consolidated Fund (No. 1) Act 1881 c. 1
 Consolidated Fund (No. 2) Act 1881 c. 8
 Consolidated Fund (No. 3) Act 1881 c. 15
 Consolidated Fund (No. 4) Act 1881 c. 50
 Conveyancing Act 1881 c. 41
 Coroners (Ireland) Act 1881 c. 35
 Corrupt Practices (Suspension of Elections) Act 1881 c. 42
 Court of Bankruptcy (Ireland) Officers and Clerks Act 1881 c. 23
 Customs (Officers) Act 1881 c. 30
 Customs and Inland Revenue Act 1881 c. 12
 East Indian Railway (Redemption of Annuities) Act 1881 c. 53
 Expiring Laws Continuance Act 1881 c. 70
 Fugitive Offenders Act 1881 c. 69
 Highways (Isle of Wight) Act 1881 c. 72
 Incumbents of Benefices Loans Extension Act 1881 c. 25
 India Office (Sale of Superfluous Land) Act 1881 c. 7
 India Office Auditor Act 1881 c. 63
 Indian Loan Act 1881 c. 54
 Inland Revenue Buildings Act 1881 c. 10
 Irish Church Act Amendment Act 1881 c. 71
 Judicial Committee Act 1881 c. 3
 Land Law (Ireland) Act 1881 c. 49
 Land Tax Commissioners (Names) Act 1881 c. 16
 Leases for Schools (Ireland) Act 1881 c. 65
 Local Government Board (Ireland) Amendment Act 1881 c. 28
 Local Taxation Returns (Scotland) Act 1881 c. 6
 Married Women's Property (Scotland) Act 1881 c. 21
 Metropolitan Board of Works (Money) Act 1881 c. 48
 Metropolitan Open Spaces Act 1881 c. 34
 Municipal Elections Amendment (Scotland) Act 1881 c. 13
 National Debt Act 1881 c. 55
 Newspaper Libel and Registration Act 1881 c. 60
 Patriotic Fund Act 1881 c. 46
 Peace Preservation (Ireland) Act 1881 c. 5
 Pedlars Act 1881 c. 45
 Petroleum (Hawkers) Act 1881 c. 67
 Petty Sessions Clerks (Ireland) Act 1881 c. 18
 Pollen Fishing (Ireland) Act 1881 c. 66
 Post Office (Land) Act 1881 c. 20
 Post Office (Newspaper) Act 1881 c. 19
 Presumption of Life Limitation (Scotland) Act 1881 c. 47
 Protection of Person and Property (Ireland) Act 1881 c. 4
 Public Loans (Ireland) Remission Act 1881 c. 32
 Public Works Loans Act 1881 c. 38
 Reformatory Institutions (Ireland) Act 1881 c. 29
 Regulation of the Forces Act 1881 c. 57
 Removal Terms (Burghs) (Scotland) Act 1881, c. 39
 Royal University of Ireland Act 1881 c. 52
 Sea Fisheries (Clam and Bait Beds) Act 1881 c. 11
 Solicitors Remuneration Act 1881 c. 44
 South Wales Bridges Act 1881 c. 14
 Statute Law Revision and Civil Procedure Act 1881 c. 59
 Stratified Ironstone Mines (Gunpowder) Act 1881 c. 26
 Summary Jurisdiction (Process) Act 1881 c. 24
 Summary Jurisdiction (Scotland) Act 1881 c. 33
 Sunday Closing (Wales) Act 1881 c. 61
 Superannuation Act 1881 c. 43
 Supreme Court of Judicature Act 1881 c. 68
 Tramways (Ireland) Amendment Act 1881 c. 17
 Universities Elections Amendment (Scotland) Act 1881 c. 40
 Veterinary Surgeons Act 1881 c. 62
 Wild Birds Protection Act 1881 c. 51

1882 (45 & 46 Vict.)

 Allotments Extension Act 1882 c. 80
 Ancient Monuments Protection Act 1882 c. 73
 Annual Turnpike Acts Continuance Act 1882 c. 52
 Appropriation Act 1882 c. 71
 Arklow Harbour Act 1882 c. 13
 Army (Annual) Act 1882 c. 7
 Arrears of Rent (Ireland) Act 1882 c. 47
 Artizans Dwellings Act 1882 c. 54
 Baths and Wash Houses Act 1882 c. 30
 Beer Dealers' Retail Licences (Amendment) Act 1882 c. 34
 Bills of Exchange Act 1882 c. 61
 Bills of Sale Act (1878) Amendment Act 1882 c. 43
 Boiler Explosions Act 1882 c. 22
 Bombay Civil Fund Act 1882 c. 45
 Casual Poor Act 1882 c. 36
 Citation Amendment (Scotland) Act 1882 c. 77
 Civil Imprisonment (Scotland) Act 1882 c. 42
 Commonable Rights Compensation Act 1882 c. 15
 Consolidated Fund (No. 1) Act 1882 c. 1
 Consolidated Fund (No. 2) Act 1882 c. 4
 Consolidated Fund (No. 3) Act 1882 c. 8
 Consolidated Fund (No. 4) Act 1882 c. 28
 Constabulary (Ireland) Amendment Act 1882 c. 63
 Conveyancing Act 1882 c. 39
 Copyright (Musical Compositions) Act 1882 c. 40
 Corn Returns Act 1882 c. 37
 Corrupt Practices (Suspension of Elections) Act 1882 c. 68
 County Court Amendment (Ireland) Act 1882 c. 29
 County Courts (Costs and Salaries) Act 1882 c. 57
 Customs and Inland Revenue Act 1882 c. 41
 Customs and Inland Revenue Buildings (Ireland) Act 1882 c. 17
 Divided Parishes and Poor Law Amendment Act 1882 c. 58
 Documentary Evidence Act 1882 c. 9
 Duke of Albany (Establishment) Act 1882 c. 5
 Educational Endowments (Scotland) Act 1882 c. 59
 Election of Representative Peers (Ireland) Act 1882 c. 26
Electric Lighting Act 1882 c. 56
 Entail (Scotland) Act 1882 c. 53
 Expiring Laws Continuance Act 1882 c. 64
 Fishery Board (Scotland) Act 1882 c. 78
 Friendly Societies (Quinquennial Returns) Act 1882 c. 35
 General Police and Improvement (Scotland) Act 1882 c. 6
 Government Annuities Act 1882 c. 51
 Highway Rate Assessment and Expenditure Act 1882 c. 27
 India (Home Charges Arrears) Act 1882 c. 79
 Inferior Courts Judgments Extension Act 1882 c. 31
 Intermediate Education (Ireland) Act 1882 c. 69
 Interments (felo de se) Act 1882 c. 19
 Irish Reproductive Loan Fund Amendment Act 1882 c. 16
 Isle of Man (Officers) Act 1882 c. 46
 Labourers Cottages and Allotments (Ireland) Act 1882 c. 60
 Lunacy Regulation Amendment Act 1882 c. 82
 Married Women's Property Act 1882 c. 75
 Merchant Shipping (Colonial Inquiries) Act 1882 c. 76
 Merchant Shipping (Expenses) Act 1882 c. 55
 Metropolis Management and Building Acts (Amendment) Act 1882 c. 14
 Metropolitan Board of Works (Money) Act 1882 c. 33
 Military Manoeuvres Act 1882 c. 10
 Militia Act 1882 c. 49
 Militia Storehouses Act 1882 c. 12
 Municipal Corporations Act 1882 c. 50
 Passenger Vessels Licences Amendment (Scotland) Act 1882 c. 66
 Pensions Commutation Act 1882 c. 44
 Petty Sessions (Ireland) Act 1882 c. 24
 Places of Worship Sites Amendment Act 1882 c. 21
 Poor Rate Assessment and Collection Act 1869, Amendment Act 1882 c. 20
 Post Office (Parcels) Act 1882 c. 74
 Post Office (Reply Post Cards) Act 1882 c. 2
 Prevention of Crime (Ireland) Act 1882 c. 25
 Prison Charities Act 1882 c. 65
 Public Health (Fruit Pickers Lodgings) Act 1882 c. 23
 Public Health (Scotland) Act 1867, Amendment Act 1882 c. 11
 Public Offices Site Act 1882 c. 32
 Public Schools (Scotland) Teachers Act 1882 c. 18
 Public Works Loans Act 1882 c. 62
 Reserve Forces Act 1882 c. 48
 Revenue, Friendly Societies, and National Debt Act 1882 c. 72
 Settled Land Act 1882 c. 38
 Slate Mines (Gunpowder) Act 1882 c. 3
 Somersham Rectory Act 1882 c. 81
 South Wales Turnpike Roads Amendment Act 1882 c. 67
 Supreme Court of Judicature (Ireland) Act 1882 c. 70

1883 (46 & 47 Vict.)

 Agricultural Holdings (England) Act 1883 c. 61
 Agricultural Holdings (Scotland) Act 1883 c. 62
 Annual Turnpike Acts Continuance Act 1883 c. 21
 Appropriation Act 1883 c. 50
 Army (Annual) Act 1883 c. 6
 Bankruptcy Act 1883 c. 52
 Bills of Sale (Ireland) Act (1879) Amendment Act 1883 c. 7
 Borough Constables Act 1883 c. 44
 Cheap Trains Act 1883 c. 34
 Cholera Hospitals (Ireland) Act 1883 c. 48
 City of London Parochial Charities Act 1883 c. 36
 Companies Act 1883 c. 28
 Companies (Colonial Registers) Act 1883 c. 30
 Consolidated Fund (No. 1) Act 1883 c. 2
 Consolidated Fund (No. 2) Act 1883 c. 5
 Consolidated Fund (No. 3) Act 1883 c. 13
 Consolidated Fund (No. 4) Act 1883 c. 23
 Consolidated Fund (Permanent Charges Redemption) Act 1883 c. 1
 Constabulary and Police (Ireland) Act 1883 c. 14
 Corrupt Practices (Suspension of Elections) Act 1883 c. 46
 Corrupt and Illegal Practices Prevention Act 1883 c. 51
 Counterfeit Medal Act 1883 c. 45
 Customs and Inland Revenue Act 1883 c. 10
 Diseases Prevention (Metropolis) Act 1883 c. 35
 Education (Scotland) Act 1883 c. 56
 Epidemic and other Diseases Prevention Act 1883 c. 59
 Expiring Laws Continuance Act 1883 c. 40
 Explosive Substances Act 1883 c. 3
 Factory and Workshop Act 1883 c. 53
 Glebe Loan (Ireland) Acts Amendment Act 1883 c. 8
 Greenwich Hospital Act 1883 c. 32
 Irish Reproductive Loan Fund Amendment Act 1883 c. 33
 Isle of Man Harbours Act 1883 c. 9
 Labourers (Ireland) Act 1883 c. 60
 Lands Clauses (Umpire) Act 1883 c. 15
 Lord Alcester's Grant Act 1883 c. 16
 Lord Wolseley's Grant Act 1883 c. 17
 Medical Act (1858) Amendment Act 1883 c. 19
 Merchant Shipping (Fishing Boats) Act 1883 c. 41
 Metropolitan Board of Works (Money) Act 1883 c. 27
 Municipal Corporations Act 1883 c. 18
 National Debt Act 1883 c. 54
 National Gallery (Loan) Act 1883 c. 4
 Patents, Designs, and Trade Marks Act 1883 c. 57
 Payment of Wages in Public-houses Prohibition Act 1883 c. 31
 Poor Law Conferences Act 1883 c. 11
 Post Office (Money Orders) Act 1883 c. 58
 Prevention of Crime (Ireland) Act 1882, Amendment (Audience of Solicitors) Act 1883 c. 12
 Prison Service (Ireland) Act 1883 c. 25
 Provident Nominations and Small Intestacies Act 1883 c. 47
 Public Health Act 1875, (Support of Sewers,) Amendment Act 1883 c. 37 (Public Health Act 1875)
 Public Works Loans Act 1883 c. 42
 Registry of Deeds Office (Ireland) Holidays Act 1883 c. 20
 Relief of Distressed Unions (Ireland) Act 1883 c. 24
 Revenue, Act 1883 c. 55
 Sea Fisheries Act 1883 c. 22
 Sea Fisheries (Ireland) Act 1883 c. 26
 Statute Law Revision Act 1883 c. 39
 Statute Law Revision and Civil Procedure Act 1883 c. 49
 Supreme Court of Judicature (Funds, &c.) Act 1883 c. 29
 Tramways and Public Companies (Ireland) Act 1883 c. 43
 Trial of Lunatics Act 1883 c. 38

1884

47 & 48 Vict.

 Annual Turnpike Acts Continuance Act 1884 c. 52
 Annuity (Sir H. Brand), 1884 c. 1
 Appropriation Act 1884 c. 73
 Army (Annual) Act 1884 c. 8
 Bankruptcy Appeals (County Courts) Act 1884 c. 9
 Bankruptcy Frauds and Disabilities (Scotland) Act 1884 c. 16
 Bishopric of Bristol Act 1884 c. 66
 Building Societies Act 1884 c. 41
 Canal Boats Act 1884 c. 75
 Chartered Companies, 1884 c. 56
 Cholera Hospitals (Ireland) Act 1884 c. 59
 Cholera, &c. Protection (Ireland) Act 1884 c. 69
 Colonial Attorneys Relief Amendment Act 1884 c. 24
 Colonial Prisoners Removal Act 1884 c. 31
 Consolidated Fund (No. 1) Act 1884 c. 4
 Consolidated Fund (No. 2) Act 1884 c. 15
 Contagious Diseases (Animals) Act 1884 c. 13
 Contagious Diseases (Animals) Transfer of Parts of Districts Act 1884 c. 47
 Corrupt Practices (Suspension of Elections) Act 1884 c. 78
 County of Dublin Jurors' and Voters' Revision Act 1884 c. 35
 Criminal Lunatics Act 1884 c. 64
 Customs and Inland Revenue Act 1884 c. 25
 Disused Burial Grounds Act 1884 c. 72
 Dublin Science and Art Museum Act 1884 c. 6
 Elections (Hours of Poll) Act 1884 c. 34
 Expiring Laws Continuance Act 1884 c. 53
 Fisheries (Oyster, Crab, and Lobster) Act (1877) Amendment Act 1884 c. 26
 Freshwater Fisheries Act 1884 c. 11
 Great Seal Act 1884 c. 30
 Greek Marriages Act 1884 c. 20
 Improvement of Lands (Ecclesiastical Benefices) Act 1884 c. 67
 Indian Marine Service Act 1884 c. 38
 Intestates Estates Act 1884 c. 71
 Isle of Man Harbours Act 1884 c. 7
 Licensing (Evidence) Act 1884 c. 29
 Loans for Schools and Training Colleges (Ireland) Act 1884 c. 22
 London Brokers' Relief Act 1884 c. 3
 Married Women's Property Act 1884 c. 14
 Matrimonial Causes Act 1884 c. 68
 Metropolitan Asylum Board (Borrowing Powers) Act 1884 c. 60
 Metropolitan Board of Works, (Money) Act 1884 c. 50
 Metropolitan Police Act 1884 c. 17
 Municipal Elections (Corrupt and Illegal Practices) Act 1884 c. 70
 National Debt Act 1884 c. 2
 National Debt (Conversion of Stock) Act 1884 c. 23
 National School Teachers Amendment (Ireland) Act 1884 c. 45
 Naval Discipline Act 1884 c. 39
 Naval Enlistment Act 1884 c. 46
 Naval Pensions Act 1884 c. 44
 New Parishes Acts and Church Building Acts Amendment Act 1884 c. 65
 Newcastle Chapter Act 1884 c. 33
 Oyster Cultivation (Ireland) Act 1884 c. 48
 Pensions and Yeomanry Pay Act 1884 c. 55
 Post Office (Protection) Act 1884 c. 76
 Prison Act 1884 c. 51
 Prisons (Ireland) Amendment Act 1884 c. 36
 Prosecution of Offences Act 1884 c. 58
 Public Health (Confirmation of Byelaws) Act 1884 c. 12
 Public Health (Ireland) Amendment Act 1884 c. 77
 Public Health (Officers) Act 1884 c. 74
 Public Libraries Act 1884 c. 37
 Public Works Loans Act 1884 c. 49
 Reformatory and Industrial Schools (Manx Children) Act 1884 c. 40
 Revenue Act 1884 c. 62
 Royal Military Asylum Chelsea (Transfer) Act 1884 c. 32
 Sea Fisheries Act 1884 c. 27
 Sea and Coast Fisheries Fund (Ireland) Act 1884 c. 21
 Settled Land Act 1884 c. 18
 Sheriff Court Houses (Scotland) Amendment Act 1884 c. 42
 Summary Jurisdiction Act 1884 c. 43
 Summary Jurisdiction over Children (Ireland) Act 1884 c. 19
 Superannuation Act 1884 c. 57
 Supreme Court of Judicature Act 1884 c. 61
 Tramways and Public Companies (Ireland) Amendment Act 1884 c. 28
 Trustee Churches (Ireland) Act 1884 c. 10
 Trusts (Scotland) Amendment Act 1884 c. 63
 Valuation (Metropolis) Amendment Act 1884 c. 5
 Yorkshire Registries Act 1884 c. 54

48 & 49 Vict.
 Additional Income Tax Act 1884 c. 1
 Consolidated Fund (No. 1) Act 1884 (Sess. 2) c. 2
 Representation of the People Act 1884 c. 3 (commonly known as the Third Reform Act)
 Tramways and Public Companies (Ireland) Act 1883, Amendment Act 1884 c. 5
 Yorkshire Registries Amendment, 1884 c. 4

1885 (48 & 49 Vict.)

 Annual Turnpike Acts Continuance Act 1885 c. 37
 Annuity, Princess Beatrice, 1885 c. 24
 Appropriation Act 1885 c. 64
 Army (Annual) Act 1885 c. 8
 Artillery and Rifle Ranges Act 1885 c. 36
 Bankruptcy (Office Accommodation) Act 1885 c. 47
 Barristers Admission (Ireland) Act 1885 c. 20
 Burial Boards (Contested Elections) Act 1885 c. 21
 Cape of Good Hope (Advance) Act 1885 c. 7
 Cholera Hospitals (Ireland) Act 1885 c. 39
 Consolidated Fund (No. 2) Act 1885 c. 6
 Consolidated Fund (No. 3) Act 1885 c. 14
 Constabulary (Ireland) Redistribution Act 1885 c. 12
 County Officers and Courts (Ireland) Amendment Act 1885 c. 71
 Criminal Law Amendment Act 1885 c. 69
 Crown Lands Act 1885 c. 79
 Customs and Inland Revenue Act 1885 c. 51
 Earldom of Mar, 1885 c. 48
 East India Loan, 1885 c. 28
 East India Unclaimed Stock Act 1885 c. 25
 Ecclesiastical Commissioners Act 1840, Amendment Act 1885 c. 55
 Ecclesiastical Commissioners Act 1885 c. 31
 Educational Endowments (Ireland) Act 1885 c. 78
 Egyptian Loan Act 1885 c. 11
 Elections (Hours of Poll) Act 1885 c. 10
 Evidence by Commission Act 1885 c. 74
 Exchequer and Treasury Bills Act 1885 c. 44
 Expiring Laws Continuance Act 1885 c. 59
 Federal Council of Australasia Act 1885 c. 60
 Friendly Societies Amendment Act 1885 c. 27
 Greenwich Hospital Act 1885 c. 42
 Highway Act Amendment Act 1885 c. 13
 Honorary Freedom of Boroughs Act 1885 c. 29
 Housing of the Working Classes Act 1885 c. 72
 Indian Army Pension Deficiency Act 1885 c. 67
 Industrial Schools (Ireland) Act 1885 c. 19
 Labourers (Ireland) Act 1885 c. 77
 Local Loans Sinking Funds Act 1885 c. 30
 Lunacy Acts Amendment Act 1885 c. 52
 Medical Relief Disqualification Removal Act 1885 c. 46
 Metropolis Management Amendment Act 1885 c. 33
 Metropolitan Board of Works (Money) Act 1885 c. 50
 Metropolitan Police Staff Superannuation Act 1885 c. 68
 Metropolitan Streets Act 1885 c. 18
 Municipal Voters Relief Act 1885 c. 9
 National Debt Act 1885 c. 43
 Parliamentary Elections (Returning Officers) Act 1885 c. 62
 Parliamentary Elections Corrupt Practices Act 1885 c. 56
 Parliamentary Registration (Ireland) Act 1885 c. 17
 Patents, Designs, and Trade Marks (Amendment) Act 1885 c. 63
 Pluralities Acts Amendment Act 1885 c. 54
 Polehampton Estates Act 1885 c. 40
 Post Office (Sites) Act 1885 c. 45
 Prevention of Crimes Amendment Act 1885 c. 75
 Public Health (Members and Officers) Act 1885 c. 53
 Public Health (Ships, &c.) Act 1885 c. 35
 Public Health and Local Government Conferences Act 1885 c. 22
 Public Works Loans Act 1885 c. 65
 Purchase of Land (Ireland) Act 1885 c. 73
 Redistribution of Seats Act 1885 c. 23
 Registration Act 1885 c. 15
 Registration Amendment (Scotland) Act 1885 c. 16
 Registration Appeals (Ireland) Act 1885 c. 66
 Revising Barristers Act 1885 c. 57
 School Boards Act 1885 c. 38
 Sea Fisheries (Scotland) Amendment Act 1885 c. 70
 Secretary for Scotland Act 1885 c. 61
 Shannon Act 1885 c. 41
 Submarine Telegraph Act 1885 c. 49
 Telegraph Act 1885 c. 58
 Thames Preservation Act 1885 c. 76
 Tithe Rentcharge Redemption Act 1885 c. 32
 Union Officers (Ireland) Act 1885 c. 80
 Water Rate Definition Act 1885 c. 34
 Yorkshire Registries Amendment Act 1885 c. 26

1886

49 & 50 Vict.

 Appropriation Act 1886 c. 26
 Army (Annual) Act 1886 c. 8
 Bankruptcy (Agricultural Labourers' Wages) Act 1886 c. 28
 Bankruptcy (Office Accommodation) Act 1886 c. 12
 British North America Act 1886 c. 35 (known in Canada as the Constitution Act, 1886)
 Burial Grounds (Scotland) Amendment Act 1886 c. 21
 Burial of Drowned Persons Act 1886 c. 20
 Cape Race Lighthouse Act 1886 c. 13
 Coal Mines Act 1886 c. 40
 Companies Act 1886 c. 23
 Consolidated Fund (No. 1) Act 1886 c. 4
 Consolidated Fund (No. 2) Act 1886 c. 7
 Contagious Diseases (Animals) Act 1886 c. 32
 Contagious Diseases Acts Repeal Act 1886 c. 10
 Crofters' Holdings (Scotland) Act 1886 c. 29
 Customs Amendment Act 1886 c. 41
 Customs and Inland Revenue Act 1886 c. 18
 Drill Grounds Act 1886 c. 5
 Extraordinary Tithe Redemption Act 1886 c. 54
 Freshwater Fisheries Act 1886 c. 2
 Glebe Loan (Ireland) Acts Amendment Act 1886 c. 6
 Guardianship of Infants Act 1886 c. 27
 Idiots Act 1886 c. 25
 Incumbents of Benefices Loans Extension Act 1886 c. 34
 International Copyright Act 1886 c. 33
 Intoxicating Liquors (Sale to Children) Act 1886 c. 56
 Labourers (Ireland) Act 1886 c. 59
 Land Registry Act 1886 c. 1
 Land Tax Commissioners Names Act 1886 c. 47
 Lunacy (Vacating of Seats) Act 1886 c. 16
 Marriage Act 1886 c. 14
 Marriages Validity Act 1886 c. 3
 Married Women (Maintenance in case of Desertion) Act 1886 c. 52
 Medical Act 1886 c. 48
 Metropolitan Board of Works (Money) Act 1886 c. 44
 Metropolitan Police Act 1886 c. 22
 Metropolitan Police (Compensation) Act 1886 c. 11
 National Debt Act 1886 c. 19
 Oxford University (Justices) Act 1886 c. 31
 Parliamentary Elections (Returning Officers) Act (1875) Amendment Act 1886 c. 57
 Patents Act 1886 c. 37
 Patriotic Fund Act 1886 c. 30
 Peace Preservation (Ireland) Continuance Act 1886 c. 24
 Peterhead Harbour of Refuge Act 1886 c. 49
 Poor Law Loans and Relief (Scotland) Act 1886 c. 51
 Poor Relief (Ireland) Act 1886 c. 17
 Prison (Officers' Superannuation) Act 1886 c. 9
 Public Works Loans Act 1886 c. 45
 Public Works Loans (Ireland) Act 1886 c. 46 
 Removal Terms (Scotland) Act 1886 c. 50
 Returning Officers (Scotland) Act 1886 c. 58
 Revising Barristers Act 1886 c. 42
 Revising Barristers (Ireland) Act 1886 c. 43
 Riot (Damages) Act 1886 c. 38
 Salmon and Freshwater Fisheries Act 1886 c. 39
 Sea Fishing Boats (Scotland) Act 1886 c. 53
 Shop Hours Regulation Act 1886 c. 55
 Sporting Lands Rating (Scotland) Act 1886 c. 15
 West Indian Incumbered Estates Act 1886 c. 36

50 Vict.
 Appropriation Act 1886, Session 2 c. 1
 Belfast Commission Act 1886 c. 4
 Expiring Laws Continuance Act 1886 c. 5
 Secret Service Money (Repeal) Act 1886 c. 2
 Submarine Telegraph Act 1886 c. 3

1887 (50 & 51 Vict.)

 Allotments Act 1887 c. 48
 Allotments and Cottage Gardens Compensation for Crops Act 1887 c. 26
 Appellate Jurisdiction Act 1887 c. 70
 Appropriation Act 1887 c. 50
 Army (Annual) Act 1887 c. 2
 Bankruptcy (Discharge and Closure) Act 1887 c. 66
 British Settlements Act 1887 c. 54
 Charitable Trusts Act 1887 c. 49
 Coal Mines Regulation Act 1887 c. 58
 Consolidated Fund (No. 1) Act 1887 c. 1
 Consolidated Fund (No. 2) Act 1887 c. 14
 Conversion of India Stock Act 1887 c. 11
 Conveyancing (Scotland) Acts (1874 and 1879) Amendment Act 1887 c. 69
 Copyhold Act 1887 c. 73
 Coroners Act 1887 c. 71
 County Courts (Expenses) Act 1887 c. 3
 Criminal Law and Procedure (Ireland) Act 1887 c. 20
 Criminal Procedure (Scotland) Act 1887 c. 35
 Crofters Holdings (Scotland) Act 1887 c. 24
 Customs Consolidation Act 1876, Amendment Act 1887 c. 7
 Customs and Inland Revenue Act 1887 c. 15
 Deeds of Arrangement Act 1887 c. 57
 Duke of Connaught's Leave, 1887 c. 10
 Escheat (Procedure) Act 1887 c. 53
 Expiring Laws Continuance Act 1887 c. 63
 Friendly Societies Act 1887 c. 56
 Incumbents Resignation Act 1871, Amendment Act 1887 c. 23
 Incumbents of Benefices Loans Extension Act 1886, Amendment Act 1887 c. 8
 Isle of Man (Customs) Act 1887 c. 5
 Land Law (Ireland) Act 1887 c. 33
 Lieutenancy Clerks Allowances Act 1887 c. 36
 Local Authorities (Expenses) Act 1887 c. 72
 Local Government (Boundaries) Act 1887 c. 61
 London Parks and Works Act 1887 c. 34
 Lunacy Districts (Scotland) Act 1887 c. 39
 Margarine Act 1887 c. 29
 Markets and Fairs (Weighing of Cattle) Act 1887 c. 27
 Merchandise Marks Act 1887 c. 28
 Merchant Shipping (Fishing Boats) Act 1887 c. 4
 Merchant Shipping (Miscellaneous) Act 1887 c. 62
 Metropolis Management (Battersea and Westminster) Act 1887 c. 17
 Metropolitan Board of Works (Money) Act 1887 c. 31
 Metropolitan Police Act 1887 c. 45
 Military Tramways Act 1887 c. 65
 National Debt and Local Loans Act 1887 c. 16
 Open Spaces Act 1887 c. 32
 Pensions (Colonial Service) Act 1887 c. 13
 Pluralities Act 1887 c. 68
 Police Disabilities Removal Act 1887 c. 9
 Prison (Officers Superannuation, Scotland) Act 1887 c. 60
 Probation of First Offenders Act 1887 c. 25
 Public Libraries Acts Amendment Act 1887 c. 22
 Public Libraries Consolidation (Scotland) Act 1887 c. 42
 Public Works Loans Act 1887 c. 37
 Public-houses, Hours of Closing (Scotland) Act 1887 c. 38
 Quarry (Fencing) Act 1887 c. 19
 Savings Banks Act 1887 c. 40
 Secretary for Scotland Act 1887 c. 52
 Settled Land Acts (Amendment) Act 1887 c. 30
 Sheriff of Lanarkshire, 1887 c. 41
 Sheriffs Act 1887 c. 55
 Stannaries Act 1887 c. 43
 Statute Law Revision Act 1887 c. 59
 Superannuation Act 1887 c. 67
 Supreme Court of Judicature (Ireland) Act 1887 c. 6
 Technical Schools (Scotland) Act 1887 c. 64
 Trinidad and Tobago Act 1887 c. 44
 Truck Amendment Act 1887 c. 46
 Truro Bishopric and Chapter Acts Amendment Act 1887 c. 12
 Trustee Savings Banks Act 1887 c. 47
 Trusts (Scotland) Act 1867, Amendment Act 1887 c. 18
 Valuation of Lands (Scotland) Amendment Act 1887 c. 51
 Water Companies (Regulation of Powers) Act 1887 c. 21

1888 (51 & 52 Vict.)

 Appropriation Act 1888 c. 61
 Army (Annual) Act 1888 c. 4
 Bail (Scotland) Act 1888 c. 36
 Borough Funds (Ireland) Act 1888 c. 53
 Companies Clauses Consolidation Act 1888 c. 48
 Consolidated Fund (No. 1) Act 1888 c. 1
 Consolidated Fund (No. 2) Act 1888 c. 16
 Consolidated Fund (No. 3) Act 1888 c. 26
 Copyright (Musical Compositions) Act 1888 c. 17
 County Courts Act 1888 c. 43
 County Electors Act 1888 c. 10
 Crofters Commission (Delegation of Powers) Act 1888 c. 63
 Customs (Wine Duty) Act 1888 c. 14
 Customs and Inland Revenue Act 1888 c. 8
Electric Lighting Act 1888 c. 12
 Employers Liability Act 1880, Continued, 1888 c. 58
 Expiring Laws Continuance Act 1888 c. 38
 Factory and Workshop Amendment (Scotland) Act 1888 c. 22
 Fishery (Ireland) Act 1888 c. 30
 Friendly Societies Act 1888 c. 66
 Glebe Lands Act 1888 c. 20
 Hawkers Act 1888 c. 33
 Imperial Defence Act 1888 c. 32
 Inebriates Act 1888 c. 19
 Isle of Man (Customs) Act 1888 c. 7
 Land Charges Registration and Searches Act 1888 c. 51
 Land Law (Ireland) Act 1888; c. 13
 Law of Distress Amendment Act 1888 c. 21
 Law of Distress and Small Debts (Ireland) Act 1888 c. 47
 Law of Libel Amendment Act 1888 c. 64
 Lloyd's Signal Stations Act 1888 c. 29
 Local Bankruptcy (Ireland) Act 1888 c. 44
 Local Government Act 1888 c. 41
 Marriages Validation Act 1888 c. 28
 Merchant Shipping (Life Saving Appliances) Act 1888 c. 24
 Metropolitan Board (Commission) Act 1888 c. 6
 Metropolitan Board of Works (Money) Act 1888 c. 40
 Mortmain and Charitable Uses Act 1888 c. 42
 Municipal Local Bills (Ireland) Act 1888 c. 34
 National Debt (Conversion) Act 1888 c. 2
 National Debt (Supplemental) Act 1888 c. 15
 National Defence Act 1888 c. 31
 North Sea Fisheries Act 1888 c. 18
 Oaths Act 1888 c. 46
 Oude and Rohilkund Railway Purchase Act 1888 c. 5
 Patents, Designs, and Trade Marks Act 1888 c. 50
 Preferential Payments in Bankruptcy Act 1888 c. 62
 Probate Duties (Scotland and Ireland) Act 1888 c. 60
 Public Health (Buildings in Streets) Act 1888 c. 52
 Public Works Loans Act 1888 c. 39
 Purchase of Land (Ireland) Amendment Act 1888 c. 49
 Railway and Canal Traffic Act 1888 c. 25
 Recorders, Magistrates, and Clerks of the Peace Act 1888 c. 23
 Roads and Bridges (Scotland) Act 1878, Amendment Act 1888 c. 9
 Sand-Grouse Protection Act 1888 c. 55
 Sea Fisheries Regulation Act 1888 c. 54
 Solicitors Act 1888 c. 65
 Special Commission Act 1888 c. 35
 Statute Law Revision Act 1888 c. 3
 Statute Law Revision (No. 2) Act 1888 c. 57
 Suffragans Nomination Act 1888 c. 56
 Supreme Court of Judicature (Ireland) Amendment Act 1888 c. 27
 Timber (Ireland) Act 1888 c. 37
 Trustee Act 1888 c. 59
 Victoria University Act 1888 c. 45
 Westminster Abbey Act 1888 c. 11

1889 (52 & 53 Vict.)

 Advertising Stations (Rating) Act 1889 c. 27
 Agricultural Holdings (Scotland) Act 1889 c. 20
 Appropriation Act 1889 c. 70
 Arbitration Act 1889 c. 49
 Army (Annual) Act 1889 c. 3
 Army and Navy Audit Act 1889 c. 31
 Assizes Relief Act 1889 c. 12
 Basutoland and British Bechuanaland Marriage Act 1889 c. 38
 Board of Agriculture Act 1889 c. 30:
 aggregated Acts for tithes, drainage, land improvement, allotments, commons, inclosures, contagious diseases, et al., from 1841 on.  
 Canada (Ontario Boundary) Act 1889 c. 28
 Clerks of Session (Scotland) Regulation Act 1889 c. 54
 Coinage Act 1889 c. 58
 Commissioners for Oaths Act 1889 c. 10
 Companies Clauses Consolidation Act 1889, c. 37
 Consolidated Fund (No. 1) Act 1889 c. 1
 Consolidated Fund (No. 2) Act 1889 c. 2
 Consolidated Fund (No. 3) Act 1889 c. 15
 Cotton Cloth Factories Act 1889 c. 62
 Council of India Reduction Act 1889 c. 65
 County Court Appeals (Ireland) Act 1889 c. 48
 Customs and Inland Revenue Act 1889 c. 7
 Expiring Laws Continuance Act 1889 c. 67
 Factors Act 1889 c. 45
 Friendly Societies Act 1889 c. 22
 General Police and Improvement (Scotland) Act 1862, Amendment Act 1889 c. 51
 Herring Fishery (Scotland) Act 1889 c. 23
 Indecent Advertisements Act 1889 c. 18
 Infectious Disease (Notification) Act 1889 c. 72
 Interpretation Act 1889 c. 63
 Judicial Factors (Scotland) Act 1889, c. 39
 Land Law (Ireland) Act 1888, Amendment Act 1889 c. 59
 Light Railways (Ireland) Act 1889 c. 66
 Local Government (Scotland) Act 1889 c. 50
 London Coal Duties Abolition Act 1889 c. 17
 London Council (Money) Act 1889 c. 61
 Lunacy Acts Amendment Act 1889 c. 41
 Master and Servant Act 1889 c. 24
 Merchant Shipping Act 1889 c. 46
 Merchant Shipping (Colours) Act 1889 c. 73
 Merchant Shipping (Pilotage) Act 1889 c. 68
 Merchant Shipping (Tonnage) Act 1889 c. 43
 National Debt Act 1889 c. 6
 National Debt Redemption Act 1889 c. 4
 National Portrait Gallery Act 1889 c. 25
 Naval Defence Act 1889 c. 8
 Official Secrets Act 1889 c. 52
 Palatine Court of Durham Act 1889 c. 47
 Parliamentary Grant (Caithness and Sutherland) Act 1889 c. 75
 Passengers Acts Amendment Act 1889, c. 29
 Paymaster General Act 1889 c. 53
 Poor Law Act 1889 c. 56
 Preferential Payments in Bankruptcy (Ireland) Act 1889 c. 60
 Prevention of Cruelty to, and Protection of, Children Act 1889 c. 44
 Prince of Wales's Children Act 1889 c. 35
 Public Bodies Corrupt Practices Act 1889 c. 69
 Public Health Act 1889 c. 64
 Public Libraries Acts Amendment Act 1889, c. 9
 Public Works Loans Act 1889 c. 71
 Purchase of Land (Ireland) Amendment Act 1889 c. 13
 Registration of County Electors (Extension of Time) Act 1889 c. 19
 Regulation of Railways Act 1889 c. 57
 Removal of Wrecks Act 1877, Amendment Act 1889 c. 5
 Revenue Act 1889 c. 42
 Sale of Horseflesh, &c. Regulation Act 1889 c. 11
 Secretary for Scotland Act 1889 c. 16
 Settled Land Act 1889 c. 36
 Small Debt Amendment (Scotland) Act 1889, c. 26
 Steam Trawling (Ireland) Act 1889 c. 74
 Technical Instruction Act 1889 c. 76
 Telegraph (Isle of Man) Act 1889 c. 34
 Town Police Clauses Act 1889, c. 14
 Trust Investment Act 1889 c. 32
 Universities (Scotland) Act 1889 c. 55
 Weights and Measures Act 1889 c. 21 (An Act for amending the Law relating to Weights and Measures and for other purposes connected therewith.)
 Welsh Intermediate Education Act 1889 c. 40
 Windward Islands Appeal Court Act 1889 c. 33

1890–1899

1890 (53 & 54 Vict.)

 Allotments Act 1890 c. 65
 Anglo-German Agreement Act 1890 c. 32
 Appropriation Act 1890 c. 72
 Army (Annual) Act 1890 c. 4
 Bankruptcy Act 1890 c. 71
 Barracks Act 1890 c. 25
 Bills of Sale Act 1890 c. 53
 Boiler Explosions Act 1890 c. 35
 Census (England and Wales) Act 1890 c. 61
 Census (Ireland) Act 1890 c. 46
 Census (Scotland) Act 1890 c. 38
 Chancery of Lancaster Act 1890 c. 23
 Colonial Courts of Admiralty Act 1890 c. 27
 Commissioners for Oaths Amendment Act 1890 c. 7
 Companies (Memorandum of Association) Act 1890 c. 62
 Companies (Winding up) Act 1890 c. 63
 Consolidated Fund (No. 1) Act 1890 c. 1
 Consolidated Fund (No. 2) Act 1890 c. 28
 Contagious Diseases (Animals) (Pleuro-pneumonia) Act 1890 c. 14
 County Councils Association Expenses Act 1890 c. 3
 Crown Office Act 1890 c. 2
 Customs Consolidation Act 1876, Amendment Act 1890 c. 56
 Customs and Inland Revenue Act 1890 c. 8
 Deeds of Arrangement Amendment Act 1890 c. 24
 Directors Liability Act 1890 c. 64
 Education Code (1890) Act 1890 c. 22
 Education of Blind and Deafmute Children (Scotland) Act 1890 c. 43
 Elections (Scotland) (Corrupt and Illegal Practices) Act 1890 c. 55
 Electric Lighting (Scotland) Act 1890 c. 13
 Expiring Laws Continuance Act 1890 c. 49
 Factors (Scotland) Act 1890 c. 40
 Foreign Jurisdiction Act 1890 c. 37
 Herring Fishery (Scotland) Act Amendment Act 1890 c. 10
 Housing of the Working Classes Act 1890  c. 70
 Infectious Disease (Prevention) Act 1890 c. 34
 Inland Revenue Regulation Act 1890 c. 21
 Intestates' Estates Act 1890 c. 29
 Local Taxation (Customs and Excise) Act 1890 c. 60
 London County Council (Money) Act 1890 c. 41
 Lunacy Act 1890 c. 5
 Marriage Act 1890 c. 47
 Merchant Shipping Act 1890 c. 9
 Metropolis Management Act 1862, Amendment Act 1890 c. 54
 Metropolis Management Amendment Act 1890 c. 66
 Municipal Elections (Scotland) Act 1890 c. 11
 Open Spaces Act 1890 c. 15
 Parliamentary Registration Expenses (Ireland) Act 1890 c. 58
 Partnership Act 1890 c. 39
 Pauper Lunatic Asylums, Ireland, Superannuation Act 1890 c. 31
 Pharmacy Act (Ireland), 1875 c. 48
 Police Act 1890 c. 45
 Police (Scotland) Act 1890 c. 67
 Poor Law Acts (Ireland) Amendment Act 1890 c. 30
 Public Health (Rating of Orchards) Act 1890 c. 17
 Public Health Acts Amendment Act 1890 c. 59
 Public Health Amendment (Scotland) Act 1890 c. 20
 Public Libraries Acts Amendment Act 1890 c. 68
 Public Works Loans Act 1890 c. 50
 Railways (Ireland) Act 1890 c. 52
 Removal Terms (Scotland) Act 1886, Amendment Act 1890 c. 36
 Reserve Forces Act 1890 c. 42
 River Suck Drainage (Provision of Funds) Act 1890 c. 12
 Seed Potatoes Supply (Ireland) Art, 1890 c. 1
 Settled Land Act 1890 c. 69
 South Indian Railway Purchase Act 1890 c. 6
 Statute Law Revision (No. 2) Act 1890 c. 51
 Statute Law Revision Act 1890 c. 33
 Superannuation (War Department) Act 1890 c. 18
 Supreme Court of Judicature Act 1890 c. 44
 Tenants Compensation Act 1890 c. 57
 Transfer of Railways (Ireland) Act 1890 c. 2
 Trustees Appointment Act 1890 c. 19
 Western Australia Constitution Act 1890 c. 26
 Working Classes Dwellings Act 1890 c. 16

1891 (54 & 55 Vict.)

 Allotments Rating Exemption Act 1891 c. 33
 Appropriation Act 1891 c. 55
 Army (Annual) Act 1891 c. 5
 Army Schools Act 1891 c. 16
 Bills of Sale Act 1891 c. 35
 Branding of Herrings (Northumberland) Act 1891 c. 28
 Brine Pumping (Compensation for Subsidence) Act 1891 c. 40
 Charitable Trusts (Recovery) Act 1891 c. 17
 Coinage Act 1891 c. 72
 Commissioners for Oaths Act 1891 c. 50
 Consolidated Fund (No. 1) Act 1891 c. 6
 Consolidated Fund (No. 2) Act 1891 c. 27
 Consular Salaries and Fees Act 1891 c. 36
 County Councils (Elections) Act 1891 c. 68
 Crofters Common Grazings Regulation Act 1891, c. 41
 Custody of Children Act 1891 c. 3
 Customs and Inland Revenue Act 1891 c. 25
 Electoral Disabilities Removal Act 1891 c. 11
 Elementary Education Act 1891, c. 56
 Expiring Laws Continuance Act 1891 c. 60
 Factory and Workshop Act 1891 c. 75
 Fisheries Act 1891 c. 37
 Foreign Marriage Act 1891 c. 74
 Forged Transfers Act 1891 c. 43
 Highways and Bridges Act 1891 c. 63
 Labourers (Ireland) Act 1891 c. 71
 Land Registry (Middlesex Deeds) Act 1891 c. 64
 Law Agents and Notaries Public (Scotland) Act 1891 c. 30
 Local Authorities Loans (Scotland) Act 1891 c. 34
 Local Registration of Title (Ireland) Act 1891 c. 66 (also known as the Registration of Title Act 1891 in Ireland)
 London County Council (Money) Act 1891 c. 62
 Lunacy Act 1891, c. 65
 Mail Ships Act 1891 c. 31
 Markets and Fairs (Weighing of Cattle) Act 1891 c. 70
 Merchandise Marks Act 1891 c. 15
 Metalliferous Mines (Isle of Man) Act 1891 c. 47
 Middlesex Registry Act 1891 c. 10
 Mortmain and Charitable Uses Act 1891 c. 73
 Museums and Gymnasiums Act 1891 c. 22
 Penal Servitude Act 1891, c. 69
 Pollen Fisheries (Ireland) Act 1891 c. 20
 Post Office Act 1891 c. 46
 Presumption of Life Limitation (Scotland) Act 1891 c. 29
 Public Accounts and Charges Act 1891 c. 24
 Public Health (London) Act 1891 c. 76
 Public Health (Scotland) Amendment Act 1891 c. 52
 Public Works Loans Act 1891 c. 59
 Purchase of Land (Ireland) Act 1891 c. 48
 Railway and Canal Traffic (Provisional Orders) Amendment Act 1891 c. 12
 Ranges Act 1891 c. 54
 Redemption of Rent (Ireland) Act 1891 c. 57
 Reformatory and Industrial Schools Act 1891 c. 23
 Registration of Certain Writs (Scotland) Act 1891 c. 9
 Registration of Electors Act 1891 c. 18
 Returning Officers (Scotland) Act 1891 c. 49
 Roads and Streets in Police Burghs (Scotland) Act 1891 c. 32
 Russian Dutch Loan Act 1891 c. 26
 Savings Banks Act 1891 c. 21
 Schools for Science and Art Act 1891 c. 61
 Seal Fishery (Behring's Sea) Act 1891 c. 19
 Seed Potatoes Supply (Ireland) Act 1891 c. 7
 Slander of Women Act 1891 c. 51
 Stamp Act 1891 c. 39
 Stamp Duties Management Act 1891 c. 38
 Statute Law Revision Act 1891 c. 67
 Supreme Court of Judicature Act 1891 c. 53
 Supreme Court of Judicature (London Causes) Act 1891 c. 14
 Taxes (Regulation of Remuneration) Act 1891 c. 13
 Technical Instruction Act 1891 c. 4
 Tithe Act 1891 c. 8
 Tramways (Ireland) Amendment Act 1891 c. 42
 Trusts (Scotland) Amendment Act 1891, c. 44
 Turbary (Ireland) Act 1891 c. 45
 Western Highlands and Islands (Scotland) Works Act 1891 c. 58

1892 (55 & 56 Vict.)

 Accumulations Act 1892 c. 58
 Alkali, &c. Works Regulation Act 1892 c. 30
 Allotments (Scotland) Act 1892 c. 54
 Ancient Monuments Protection (Ireland) Act 1892 c. 46
 Appropriation Act 1892 c. 33
 Army (Annual) Act 1892 c. 2
 Bank Act 1892 c. 48
 Betting and Loans (Infants) Act 1892 c. 4
 Boards of Management of Poor Law District Schools (Ireland) Act 1892 c. 41
 British Columbia (Loan) Act 1892 c. 52
 Burgh Police (Scotland) Act 1892 c. 55
 Charity Inquiries (Expenses) Act 1892 c. 15
 Clergy Discipline Act 1892 c. 32
 Colonial Probates Act 1892 c. 6
 Colonial Stock Act 1892 c. 35
 Consolidated Fund (No. 1) Act 1892 c. 3
 Consolidated Fund (No. 2) Act 1892 c. 20
 Contagious Diseases (Animals) Act 1892 c. 47
 Conveyancing and Law of Property Act 1892 c. 13
 Coroners Act 1892 c. 56
 Customs and Inland Revenue Act 1892 c. 16
 Drainage and Improvement of Land (Ireland) Act 1892 c. 65
 Education and Local Taxation Account (Scotland) Act 1892 c. 51
 Expiring Laws Continuance Act 1892 c. 60
 Foreign Marriage Act 1892 c. 23
 Forged Transfers Act 1892 c. 36
 Gaming Act 1892 c. 9
 Hares Preservation Act 1892 c. 8
 High Court of Justiciary (Scotland) Act 1892 c. 21
 Housing of the Working Classes Act 1890, Amendment (Scotland) Act 1892 c. 22
 Indian Councils Act 1892 c. 14
 Irish Education Act 1892 c. 42
 Isle of Man Customs Act 1892 c. 28
 Labourers (Ireland) Act 1892 c. 7
 Land Commissioners (Ireland) Salaries Act 1892 c. 45
 Mauritius Hurricane Loan Act 1892 c. 49
 Merchant Shipping Act 1892 c. 37
 Military Lands Act 1892 c. 43
 Millbank Prison Act 1892 c. 1
 Mortmain and Charitable Uses Act Amendment Act 1892 c. 11
 National Debt (Conversion of Exchequer Bonds) Act 1892 c. 26
 National Debt (Stockholders Relief) Act 1892 c. 39
 Naval Knights of Windsor (Dissolution) Act 1892 c. 34
 Parliamentary Deposits and Bonds Act 1892 c. 27
 Police Returns Act 1892 c. 38
 Poor Law (Ireland) Act 1892 c. 5
 Post Office Act 1892 c. 24
 Private Street Works Act 1892 c. 57
 Public Libraries Act 1892 c. 53
 Public Works Loans Act 1892 c. 61
 Railway and Canal Traffic Act 1892 c. 44
 Roads and Bridges (Scotland) Amendment Act 1892; c. 12
 Salmon and Freshwater Fisheries Act 1892 c. 50
 Sheriff Courts (Scotland) Extracts Act 1892 c. 17
 Shop Hours Act 1892 c. 62
 Short Titles Act 1892 c. 10
 Small Holdings Act 1892 c. 31
 Statute Law Revision Act 1892 c. 19
 Superannuation Act 1892 c. 40
 Taxes (Regulation of Remuneration) Amendment Act 1892 c. 25
 Technical Instruction Amendment (Scotland) Act 1892 c. 63
 Technical and Industrial Institutions Act 1892 c. 29
 Telegraph Act 1892 c. 59
 Weights and Measures (Purchase) Act 1892 c. 18
 Witnesses (Public Inquiries) Protection Act 1892 c. 64

Local acts
 Birmingham Corporation Water Act c. clxxiii

1893 (56 & 57 Vict.)
 Appeal (Forma Pauperis) Act 1893 c. 22
 Appropriation Act 1893 c. 60
 Army (Annual) Act 1893 c. 4
 Barbed Wire Act 1893 c. 32
 Burgh Police (Scotland) Act 1893 c. 25
 Burghs Gas Supply (Scotland) Act 1893 c. 52
 Cholera Hospitals (Ireland) Act 1893 c. 13
 Coinage Act 1893 c. 1
 Companies (Winding-up) Act 1893 c. 58
 Congested Districts Board (Ireland) Act 1893 c. 35
 Consolidated Fund (No. 1) Act 1893 c. 3
 Consolidated Fund (No. 2) Act 1893 c. 16
 Consolidated Fund (No. 3) Act 1893 c. 28
 Consolidated Fund (No. 4) Act 1893 c. 46
 Contagious Diseases (Animals) Act 1893 c. 43
 Conveyance of Mails Act 1893 c. 38
 County Surveyors (Ireland) Act 1893 c. 49
 Customs and Inland Revenue Act 1893 c. 7
 Day Industrial Schools (Scotland) Act 1893 c. 12
 Duchy of Cornwall Management Act 1893 c. 20
 East India Loan Act 1893 c. 70
 Elementary Education (Blind and Deaf Children) Act 1893 c. 42
 Elementary Education (School Attendance) Act 1893 c. 51
 Expiring Laws Continuance Act 1893 c. 59
 Fertilisers and Feeding Stuffs Act 1893 c. 56
 Friendly Societies Act 1893 c. 30
 Housing of the Working Classes Act 1893 c. 33
 Improvement of Land (Scotland) Act 1893 c. 34
 Industrial and Provident Societies Act 1893 c. 39
 Irish Education Act 1893 c. 41
 Isolation Hospitals Act 1893 c. 68
 Land Tax Commissioners Names Act 1893 c. 27
 Law of Commons Amendment Act 1893 c. 57
 Law of Distress and Small Debts, (Ireland) Act 1893 c. 36
 Light Railways (Ireland) Act 1893 c. 50
 Liverpool Court of Passage Act 1893 c. 37
 Local Authorities Loans (Scotland) Act 1891, Amendment Act 1893 c. 8
 Madras and Bombay Armies Act 1893 c. 62
 Married Women's Property Act 1893 c. 63
 Metropolis Management (Plumstead and Hackney) Act 1893 c. 55
 Municipal Corporations Act 1893 c. 9
 National Debt Redemption Act 1893 c. 64
 Naval Defence Act 1893 c. 45
 North Sea Fisheries Act 1893 c. 17
 Police Act 1893 c. 10
 Police Disabilities Removal Act 1893 c. 6
 Prison (Officers' Superannuation) Act 1893 c. 26
 Public Authorities Protection Act 1893 c. 61
 Public Health (London) Act 1891, Amendment Act 1893 c. 47
 Public Libraries (Amendment) Act 1893 c. 11
 Public Works Loans Act 1893 c. 24
 Public Works Loans (No. 2) Act 1893 c. 40
 Public Works Loans (No. 3) Act 1893 c. 65
 Railway Regulation Act 1893 c. 29
 Reformatory Schools Act 1893 c. 48
 Reformatory Schools (Scotland) Act 1893 c. 15
 Regimental Debts Act 1893 c. 5
 Rivers Pollution Prevention Acts, 1893 c. 31
 Rules Publication Act 1893 c. 66
 Sale of Goods Act 1893 c. 71
 Savings Bank Act 1893 c. 69
 Seal Fishery (North Pacific) Act 1893 c. 23
 Sheriff Courts Consignations (Scotland) Act 1893 c. 44
 Shop Hours Act 1893 c. 67
 Statute Law Revision Act 1893 c. 14
 Statute Law Revision (No. 2) Act 1893 c. 54
 Trade Union (Provident Funds) Act 1893 c. 2
 Treasury Chest Fund Act 1893 c. 18
 Trustee Act 1893 c. 53
 Voluntary Conveyances Act 1893 c. 21
 Weights and Measures Act 1893 c. 19

1894

56 & 57 Vict.

 Colonial Acts Confirmation Act 1894 c. 72
 Local Government Act 1894 c. 73

57 & 58 Vict.

 Appropriation Act 1894 c. 59
 Arbitration (Scotland) Act 1894 c. 13
 Army (Annual) Act 1894 c. 3
 Behring Sea Award Act 1894 c. 2
 Bishopric of Bristol Amendment Act 1894 c. 21
 British Museum (Purchase of Land) Act 1894 c. 34
 Building Societies Act 1894 c. 47
 Burgh Police (Scotland) Act 1892, Amendment Act 1894 c. 18
 Charitable Trusts (Places of Religious Worship) Amendment Act 1894 c. 35
 Chimney Sweepers Act 1894 c. 51
 Coal Mines (Check Weigher) Act 1894 c. 52
 Colonial Officers (Leave of Absence) Act 1894 c. 17
 Commissioners of Works Act 1894 c. 23
 Congested Districts Board (Ireland) Act 1894 c. 50
 Consolidated Fund (No. 1) Act 1894 c. 1
 Consolidated Fund (No. 2) Act 1894 c. 7
 Consolidated Fund (No. 3) Act 1894 c. 29
 Copyhold Act 1894 c. 46
 County Councils Association (Scotland) Expenses Act 1894 c. 5
 Crown Lands Act 1894 c. 43
 Diseases of Animals Act 1894 c. 57
 Expiring Laws Continuance Act 1894 c. 48
 Finance Act 1894 c. 30
 Fishery Board (Scotland) Extension of Powers Act 1894 c. 14
 Four Courts Library Act 1894 c. 4
 Heritable Securities (Scotland) Act 1894 c. 44
 Housing of the Working Classes Act 1894 c. 55
 Indian Railways Act 1894 c. 12
 Industrial Schools Acts Amendment Act 1894 c. 33
 Industrial and Provident Societies Act 1894 c. 8
 Injured Animals Act 1894 c. 22
 Jurors (Ireland) Amendment Act 1894 c. 49
 Local Government (Scotland) Act 1894 c. 58
 Locomotive Threshing Engines Act 1894 c. 37
 London (Equalisation of Rates) Act 1894 c. 53
 Merchandise Marks (Prosecutions) Act 1894 c. 19
 Merchant Shipping Act 1894 c. 60
 Music and Dancing Licences (Middlesex) Act 1894 c. 15
 Nautical Assessors (Scotland) Act 1894 c. 40
 Notice of Accidents Act 1894 c. 28
 Outdoor Relief Friendly Societies Act 1894 c. 25
 Prevention of Cruelty to Children Act 1894 c. 41
 Prevention of Cruelty to Children (Amendment) Act 1894 c. 27
 Prize Courts Act 1894 c. 39
 Public Libraries (Ireland) Act 1894 c. 38
 Public Libraries (Scotland) Act 1894 c. 20
 Public Works Loans Act 1894 c. 11
 Quarries Act 1894 c. 42
 Quarter Sessions Act 1894 c. 6
 Railway and Canal Traffic Act 1894 c. 54
 Registration Acceleration Act 1894 c. 32
 Sea Fisheries (Shell Fish) Regulation Act 1894 c. 26
 Solicitors Act 1894 c. 9
 Statute Law Revision Act 1894 c. 56
 Supreme Court of Judicature (Procedure) Act 1894 c. 16
 Trustee Act 1893, Amendment Act 1894 c. 10
 Uniforms Act 1894 c. 45
 Valuation of Lands (Scotland) Acts Amendment Act 1894 c. 36
 Wild Birds Protection Act 1894 c. 24
 Zanzibar Indemnity Act 1894 c. 31

1895

58 & 59 Vict.

 Appropriation Act 1895 c. 31
 Army (Annual) Act 1895 c. 7
 Australian Colonies Duties Act 1895 c. 3
 Colonial Boundaries Act 1895 c. 34
 Consolidated Fund (No. 1) Act 1895 c. 4
 Consolidated Fund (No. 2) Act 1895 c. 15
 Convention of Royal Burghs (Scotland) Act 1879, Amendment Act 1895 c. 6
 Corrupt and Illegal Practices Prevention Act 1895 c. 40
 Court of Session Consignations (Scotland) Act 1895 c. 19
 Courts of Law Fees (Scotland) Act 1895 c. 14
 Cruelty to Animals (Scotland) Act 1895 c. 13
 Documentary Evidence Act 1895 c. 9
 Extradition Act 1895 c. 33
 Factory and Workshop Act 1895 c. 37
 False Alarms of Fire Act 1895 c. 28
 Fatal Accidents Inquiry (Scotland) Act 1895 c. 36
 Finance Act 1895 c. 16
 Fisheries Close Season (Ireland) Act 1895 c. 29
 Friendly Societies Act 1895 c. 26
 Grand Jury (Ireland) Act 1895 c. 8
 Industrial and Provident Societies (Amendment) Act 1895 c. 30
 Isle of Man (Customs) Act 1895 c. 38
 Judicial Committee Amendment Act 1895 c. 44
 Lands Clauses (Taxation of Costs) Act 1895 c. 11
 Lands Valuation (Scotland) Amendment Act 1895 c. 41
 Law of Distress Amendment Act 1895 c. 24
 Local Government (Scotland) Act 1894, Amendment Act 1895 c. 1
 Local Government (Stock Transfer) Act 1895 c. 32
 Market Gardeners' Compensation Act 1895 c. 27
 Metropolitan Police (Receiver) Act 1895 c. 12
 Mortgagees Legal Costs Act 1895 c. 25
 Mr. Speaker's Retirement Act 1895 c. 10
 Naturalization Act 1895 c. 43
 Naval Works Act 1895 c. 35
 Out-door Relief (Ireland) Act 1895 c. 22
 Post Office Amendment Act 1895 c. 18
 Reformatory and Industrial Schools (Channel Islands Children) Act 1895 c. 17
 Sea Fisheries Regulation (Scotland) Act 1895 c. 42
 Seal Fisheries (North Pacific) Act 1895 c. 21
 Seed Potatoes Supply (Ireland) Act 1895 c. 2
 Shop Hours Act 1895 c. 5
 Summary Jurisdiction (Married Women) Act 1895 c. 39
 Tramways (Ireland) Act 1895 c. 20
 Volunteer Act 1895 c. 23

59 Vict. Sess. 2

Public General Acts
 Appropriation Act 1895, Session 2 c. 6
 Canadian Speaker (Appointment of Deputy) Act 1895, Session 2 c. 3
 Expiring Laws Continuance Act 1895, Session 2 c. 1
 Public Offices (Acquisition of Site) Act 1895, Session 2 c. 5
 Public Works Loans Act 1895, Session 2 c. 2
 Purchase of Land (Ireland) Amendment Act 1895, Session 2 c. 4

Local Acts
 Military Lands Provisional Order Confirmation (No. 2) Act 1895 Session 2 c. xv

1896 (59 & 60 Vict.)
 Agricultural Rates Act 1896 c. 16
 Agricultural Rates, Congested Districts, and Burgh Land Tax Relief (Scotland) Act 1896 c. 37
 Appropriation Act 1896 c. 46
 Army (Annual) Act 1896 c. 2
 Baths and Washhouses Act 1896 c. 59
 Bishopric of Bristol Amendment Act 1896 c. 29
 Burglary Act 1896 c. 57
 Chairmen of District Councils Act 1896 c. 22
 Coal Mines Regulation Act 1896 c. 43
 Collecting Societies and Industrial Assurance Companies Act 1896 c. 26
 Conciliation Act 1896 c. 30
 Consolidated Fund (No. 1) Act 1896 c. 3
 Consolidated Fund (No. 2) Act 1896 c. 7
 Derelict Vessels (Report) Act 1896 c. 12
 Diseases of Animals Act 1896 c. 15
 Dispensary Committees (Ireland) Act 1896 c. 10
 Edinburgh General Register House Act 1896 c. 24
 Expiring Laws Continuance Act 1896 c. 39
 Finance Act 1896 c. 28
 Fisheries (Norfolk and Suffolk) Act 1896 c. 18
 Friendly Societies Act 1896 c. 25
 Glasgow Parliamentary Divisions, Act 1896 c. 17
 Housing, of the Working Classes Act 1890, Amendment (Scotland) Act 1896 c. 31
 Housing of the Working Classes (Ireland) Act 1896 c. 11
 Incumbents of Benefices Loans Extension Act 1896 c. 13
 Judicial Trustees Act 1896 c. 35
 Labourers (Ireland) Act 1896 c. 53
 Land Law (Ireland) Act 1896 c. 47
 Larceny Act 1896 c. 52
 Law Agents (Scotland) Act Amendment Act 1896 c. 49
 Life Assurance Companies (Payment into Court) Act 1896 c. 8
 Light Railways Act 1896 c. 48
 Liverpool Court of Passage Act 1896 c. 21
 Local Government (Determination of Differences) Act 1896 c. 9
 Local Government (Elections) Act 1896 c. 1
 Local Government (Elections) (No. 2) Act 1896 c. 4
 Local Taxation (Ireland) Estate Duty Act 1896 c. 41
 Locomotives on Highways Act 1896 c. 36
 London Cab Act 1896 c. 27
 Naval Works Act 1896 c. 6
 Orkney and Zetland Small Piers and Harbours Act 1896 c. 32
 Poor Law Guardians (Ireland) (Women) Act 1896 c. 5
 Poor Law Officers' Superannuation Act 1896 c. 50
 Public Health Act 1896 c. 19
 Public Health (Ireland) Act 1896 c. 54
 Public Health (Ports) Act 1896 c. 20
 Public Offices (Westminster Site) Act 1896 c. 23
 Public Works Loans Act 1896 c. 42
 Quarter Sessions (London) Act 1896 c. 55
 Railways (Ireland) Act 1896 c. 34
 Royal Naval Reserve Volunteer Act 1896 c. 33
 Short Titles Act 1896 c. 14
 Stannaries Court (Abolition) Act 1896 c. 45
 Telegraph (Money) Act 1896 c. 40
 Truck Act 1896 c. 44
 Uganda Railway Act 1896 c. 38
 Vexatious Actions Act 1896 c. 51
 West Highland Railway Guarantee Act 1896 c. 58
 Wild Birds Protection Act 1896 c. 56

1897 (60 & 61 Vict.)
 Appropriation Act 1897 c. 67
 Archdeaconry of Cornwall Act 1897 c. 9
 Archdeaconry of London (Additional Endowment) Act 1897 c. 45
 Army (Annual) Act 1897 c. 3
 Chaff-Cutting Machines (Accidents) Act 1897 c. 60
 Cleansing of Persons Act 1897 c. 31
 Congested Districts (Scotland) Act 1897 c. 53
 Consolidated Fund (No. 1) Act 1897 c. 4
 Constabulary (Ireland) Act 1897 c. 64
 Cotton Cloth Factories Act 1897 c. 58
 County Dublin Surveyors Act 1897 c. 2
 Dangerous Performances Act 1897 c. 52
 District Councils (Water Supply Facilities) Act 1897 c. 44
 East India Company's Officers Superannuation Act 1897 c. 10
 Edinburgh University (Transfer of Patronage) Act 1897 c. 13
 Education (Scotland) Act 1897 c. 62
 Elementary Education Act 1897 c. 16
 Expiring Laws Continuance Act 1897 c. 54
 Extraordinary Tithe Act 1897 c. 23
 Finance Act 1897 c. 24
 Foreign Prison Made Goods Act 1897 c. 63
 Infant Life Protection Act 1897 c. 57
 Isle of Man (Church Building and New Parishes) Act 1897 c. 33
 Juries Detention Act 1897 c. 18
 Land Transfer Act 1897 c. 65
 Licensing Amendment (Scotland) Act 1897 c. 50
 Local Government Act 1897 c. 1
 Local Government (Joint Committees) Act 1897 c. 40
 Market Gardeners Compensation (Scotland) Act 1897 c. 22
 Merchant Shipping Act 1897 c. 59
 Merchant Shipping (Exemption from Pilotage) Act 1897 c. 61
 Mersey Channels Act 1897 c. 21
 Metropolis Water Act 1897 c. 56
 Metropolitan Police (Borrowing Powers) Act 1897 c. 42
 Metropolitan Police Courts Act 1897 c. 26
 Metropolitan Police Courts (Holidays) Act 1897 c. 14
 Military Lands Act 1897 c. 6
 Military Manoeuvres Act 1897 c. 43
 Military Works Act 1897 c. 7
 Municipal Elections (Scotland) Act 1897 c. 34
 Naval Works Act 1897 c. 35
 Navy and Marines (Wills) Act 1897 c. 15
 Out-door Relief (Ireland) Act 1897 c. 36
 Parish Councils Casual Vacancies (Scotland) Act 1897 c. 49
 Patent Office (Extension) Act 1897 c. 25
 Police (Property) Act 1897 c. 30
 Poor Law Act 1897 c. 29
 Poor Law Officers Superannuation Act Amendment Act 1897 c. 28
 Post Office and Telegraph Act 1897 c. 41
 Preferential Payments in Bankruptcy Amendment Act 1897 c. 19
 Public Health (Scotland) Act 1897 c. 38
 Public Offices (Whitehall) Site Act 1897 c. 27
 Public Works Loans Act 1897 c. 51
 Quarter Sessions Jurors (Ireland) Act 1897 c. 20
 Railway Assessors (Scotland) Superannuation Act 1897 c. 12
 Regular and Elders' Widows' Funds Act 1897 c. 11
 School Board Conference Act 1897 c. 32
 Stipendiary Magistrates Jurisdiction (Scotland) Act 1897 c. 48
 Supreme Court of Judicature (Ireland) Act 1897 c. 17
 Supreme Court of Judicature (Ireland) (No. 2) Act 1897 c. 66
 Trusts (Scotland) Act 1897 c. 8
 Voluntary Schools Act 1897 c. 5
 Volunteer Act 1897 c. 47
 Weights and Measures (Metric System) Act 1897 c. 46 (An Act to legalise the Use of Weights and Measures of the Metric System.)
 Wicklow Harbour Advances Act 1897 c. 55
 Workmen's Compensation Act 1897 c. 37
 Yorkshire Coroners Act 1897 c. 39

1898 (61 & 62 Vict.)
 Appropriation Act 1898 c. 61
 Army (Annual) Act 1898 c. 1
 Bail Act 1898 c. 7
 Benefices Act 1898 c. 48
 Canals Protection (London) Act 1898 c. 16
 Circuit Clerks (Scotland) Act 1898 c. 40
 Companies Act 1898 c. 26
 Consolidated Fund (No. 1) Act 1898 c. 3
 Consolidated Fund (No. 2) Act 1898 c. 32
 Criminal Evidence Act 1898 c. 36
 East India Loan Act 1898 c. 13
 Elementary School Teachers (Superannuation) Act 1898 c. 57
 Ex-officio Justices of the Peace (Scotland) Act 1898 c. 20
 Expiring Laws Continuance Act 1898 c. 47
 Finance Act 1898 c. 10
 Greek Loan Act 1898 c. 4
 Greenwich Hospital Act 1898 c. 24
 Inebriates Act 1898 c. 60
 Isle of Man (Customs) Act 1898 c. 27
 Kingstown Township (Transfer of Harbour Roads) Act 1898 c. 52
 Libraries Offences Act 1898 c. 53
 Local Government (Ireland) Act 1898 c. 37
 Local Taxation Account (Scotland) Act 1898 c. 56
 Locomotives Act 1898 c. 29
 Marriage Act 1898 c. 58
 Merchant Shipping (Liability of Shipowners) Act 1898 c. 14
 Merchant Shipping (Mercantile Marine Fund) Act 1898 c. 44
 Metropolitan Commons Act 1898 c. 43
 Metropolitan Police Courts Act 1898 c. 31
 Metropolitan Poor Act 1898 c. 45
 Mussels, Periwinkles and Cockles (Ireland) Act 1898 c. 28
 Out-door Relief (Ireland) Act 1898 c. 51
 Parish Fire-Engines Act 1898 c. 38
 Pauper Children (Ireland) Act 1898 c. 30
 Pharmacy Acts Amendment Act 1898 c. 25
 Poor Law (Scotland) Act 1898 c. 21
 Poor Law Unions Association (Expenses) Act 1898 c. 19
 Post Office (Guarantee) Act 1898 c. 18
 Post Office Guarantee (No. 2) Act 1898 c. 59
 Public Buildings Expenses Act 1898 c. 5
 Public Record Office Act 1898 c. 12
 Public Works Loans Act 1898 c. 54
 Prison Act 1898 c. 41
 Registration (Ireland) Act 1898 c. 2
 Reserve Forces and Militia Act 1898 c. 9
 Revenue Act 1898 c. 46
 Rivers Pollution Prevention (Border Councils) Act 1898 c. 34
 Seed Supply and Potato Spraying (Ireland) Act 1898 c.50
 Sheriffs Tenure of Office (Scotland) Act 1898 c. 8
 Societies' Borrowing Powers Act 1898 c. 15
 Solicitors (Ireland) Act 1898 c. 17
 Special Juries Act 1898 c. 6
 Statute Law Revision Act 1898 c. 22
 Suffragan Bishops Act 1898 c. 11
 Telegraph (Money) Act 1898 c. 33
 Trusts (Scotland) Act 1898 c. 42
 Union of Benefices Act 1898 c. 23
 Universities and College Estates Act 1898 c. 55
 University of London Act 1898 c. 62
 Vaccination Act 1898 c. 49
 Vagrancy Act 1898 c. 39
 Vexatious Actions (Scotland) Act 1898 c. 35

1899

62 & 63 Vict.

Public General Acts
 Agriculture and Technical Instruction (Ireland) Act 1899 c. 50
 Anchors and Chain Cables Act 1899 c. 23
 Appropriation Act 1899 c. 49
 Army (Annual) Act 1899 c. 3
 Baths and Washhouses Act 1899 c. 29
 Board of Education Act 1899 c. 33
 Bodies Corporate (Joint Tenancy) Act 1899 c. 20
 Colonial Loans Act 1899 c. 36
 Commons Act 1899 c. 30
 Congested Districts Board (Ireland) Act 1899 c. 18
 Consolidated Fund (No. 1) Act 1899 c. 2
Electric Lighting (Clauses) Act 1899 c. 19
 Elementary Education (Defective and Epileptic Children) Act 1899 c. 32
 Elementary Education (School Attendance) Act (1893) Amendment Act 1899 c. 13
 Expiring Laws Continuance Act 1899 c. 34
 Finance Act 1899 c. 9
 Fine or Imprisonment (Scotland and Ireland) Act 1899 c. 11
 Gordon Memorial College at Khartoum Act 1899 c. 16
 Improvement of Land Act 1899 c. 46
 Inebriates Act 1899 c. 35
 Infectious Disease (Notification) Extension Act 1899 c. 8
 Isle of Man (Customs) Act 1899 c. 39
 Land Tax Commissioners Names Act 1899 c. 25
 Lincolnshire Coroners Act 1899 c. 48
 London Government Act 1899 c. 14
 Manchester Canonries Act 1899 c. 28
 Marriages Validity Act 1899 c. 27
 Metropolis Management Acts Amendment (Byelaws) Act 1899 c. 15
 Metropolis Water Act 1899 c. 7
 Metropolitan Police Act 1899 c. 26
 Military Works Act 1899 c. 41
 Naval Works Act 1899 c. 42
 Parish Councillors (Tenure of Office) Act 1899 c. 10
 Partridge Shooting (Ireland) Act 1899 c. 1
 Patriotic Fund Act 1899 c. 45
 Poor Law Act 1899 c. 37
 Private Legislation Procedure (Scotland) Act 1899 c. 47
 Public Libraries (Scotland) Act 1899 c. 5
 Public Works Loans Act 1899 c. 31
 Reformatory Schools Act 1899 c. 12
 Reserve Forces Act 1899 c. 40
 Royal Niger Company Act 1899 c. 43
 Sale of Food and Drugs Act 1899 c. 51
 Seats for Shop Assistants Act 1899 c. 21
 Small Dwellings Acquisition Act 1899 c. 44
 Solicitors Act 1899 c. 4
 Summary Jurisdiction Act 1899 c. 22
 Supreme Court of Judicature Act 1899 c. 6
 Telegraph Act 1899 c. 38
 Tithe Rentcharge (Rates) Act 1899 c. 17
 University of London Act 1899 c. 24

Local Acts
 Local Government Board (Ireland) Provisional Order Confirmation (No. 4) Act c. 34
  Manchester Corporation (General Powers) Act

62 & 63 Vict. Sess. 2
 Appropriation Act 1899, Session 2 c. 1
 Second Session (Explanation) Act 1899 c. 3
 Treasury Bills Act 1899 c. 2

See also
List of Acts of the Parliament of the United Kingdom

References

External links
The Public General Statutes, Volume 15: 43 Victoria – 1880 also
The Public General Statutes, Volume 16: 43 & 44 Victoria – 1880  
The Public General Statutes, Volume 17: 44 & 45 Victoria – 1881
The Public General Statutes, Volume 18: 45 & 46 Victoria – 1882 The Public General Acts: 45 & 46 Victoria – 1882
The Public General Statutes, Volume 19: 46 & 47 Victoria – 1883
The Public General Statutes, Volume 20: 47 & 48 Victoria – 1884
The Public General Statutes, Volume 21: 48 & 49 Victoria – 1884-5 The Public General Acts: 48 & 49 Victoria – 1884-5
The Public General Statutes, Volume 22: 49 & 50 Victoria - 1886 also
The Public General Statutes, Volume 23: 50 Victoria - 1886
The Public General Statutes, Volume 24: 50 & 51 Victoria – 1887
The Public General Statutes, Volume 25: 51 & 52 Victoria – 1888
The Public General Statutes, Volume 26: 52 & 53 Victoria – 1889
The Public General Statutes, Volume 27: 53 & 54 Victoria – 1890
The Public General Statutes, Volume 28: 54 & 55 Victoria – 1891
The Public General Statutes, Volume 29: 55 & 56 Victoria – 1892
The Public General Statutes, Volume 30: 56 & 57 Victoria – 1893-4 
The Public General Statutes, Volume 31: 57 & 58 Victoria – 1894
The Public General Statutes, Volume 32: 58 & 59 and 59 Victoria – 1895
The Public General Statutes, Volume 33: 59 & 60 Victoria – 1896
The Public General Statutes, Volume 34: 60 & 61 Victoria – 1897
The Public General Statutes, Volume 35: 61 & 62 Victoria – 1898
The Public General Statutes, Volume 36: 62 & 63 Victoria – 1899

1880
1880s in the United Kingdom
1890s in the United Kingdom